Deirdre Delaney is a camogie player and sales representative. She played in the 2009 All Ireland camogie final. One of the mainstays of the all conquering St Lachtain's teams, Deirdre has assisted the Freshford side to ten county, six Leinster and three All-Ireland club titles. Has won provincial inter-county medals in the Under-16 and Minor grades.

References

External links 
 Official Camogie Website
 Kilkenny Camogie Website
 of 2009 championship in On The Ball Official Camogie Magazine
 https://web.archive.org/web/20091228032101/http://www.rte.ie/sport/gaa/championship/gaa_fixtures_camogie_oduffycup.html Fixtures and results] for the 2009 O'Duffy Cup
 All-Ireland Senior Camogie Championship: Roll of Honour
 Video highlights of 2009 championship Part One and part two
 Video Highlights of 2009 All Ireland Senior Final
 Report of All Ireland final in Irish Times Independent and Examiner

1985 births
Living people
Kilkenny camogie players